Nemnichia is a genus of mites in the family Parasitidae.

Species
 Nemnichia elegantulus (C.L.Koch, 1839)

References

Parasitidae